The 2022 Georgia Attorney General election was held on November 8, 2022, to elect the Attorney General of Georgia. Incumbent Republican attorney general Christopher M. Carr was appointed to the office on November 1, 2016, following the resignation of Sam Olens to become the president of Kennesaw State University. Carr ran for a second full term in office. Carr won re-election over state senator Jen Jordan by a margin of 5.3 points.

Republican primary

Candidates

Nominee
Chris Carr, incumbent attorney general

Eliminated in primary
John Gordon, businessman and lawyer

Endorsements

Polling

Results

Democratic primary

Candidates

Nominee
Jen Jordan, state senator from the 6th district

Eliminated in primary
Christian Wise Smith, lawyer

Withdrawn
Charlie Bailey, former Fulton County senior assistant district attorney and nominee for Attorney General in 2018 (running for Lieutenant Governor)

Endorsements

Results

Libertarian primary

Candidates

Declared
Martin Cowen, former Clayton County probate judge

General election

Predictions

Endorsements

Polling 
Graphical summary

Results

See also 
2022 Georgia state elections

Notes

References

External links
Official campaign websites
Chris Carr (R) for Attorney General
Martin Cowen (L) for Attorney General
Jen Jordan (D) for Attorney General

Attorney General
Georgia
Georgia (U.S. state) Attorney General elections